The 2004 VMI Keydets football team represented the Virginia Military Institute during the 2004 NCAA Division I-AA football season. It was the Keydets' 114th year of football, and their 2nd season in the Big South Conference.

VMI went 0–11 on the year, failing to win a game in a season for only the third time in program history, and the first time since 1997 under Ted Cain.

Schedule

Source: 2004 VMI Football Schedule

References

VMI
VMI Keydets football seasons
College football winless seasons
VMI Keydets football